Polti may refer to:

 Team Polti, an Italian cycling team
 Georges Polti, a French author